Zarqan (also Romanized as Zarqān; also known as Zarghanak and Zargān) is a city and capital of Zarqan District, in Shiraz County, Fars Province, Iran.  At the 2006 census, its population was 19,861, in 5,127 families.  It is served by Zarqan Airport.

Etymology
Zarqan comes from "Zarghoon", which in Pahlavi means the place is lush.

Zarqan in books
It is said that Zarqan had good mules for hiring and transporting. Therefore, this city was important for business and transportation during 1791.
Historically, Zaqan counted as the battle field among Afghan and Afshari dynasty.

See also

 Imamzadeh Qasim (Zarqan)

References

Populated places in Zarqan County
Cities in Fars Province